Parmenion or Parmenio may refer to:

Parmenion high general of Philip and Alexander
Parmenion (architect) in Alexandria (4th-3rd century BC)
Parmenion (poet) of Greek Anthology